Walter Pindter (1911–1989) was a German cinematographer.

Selected filmography
 Little Girl, Great Fortune (1933)
 Cocoanut (1939)
 Central Rio (1939)
 Woman Made to Measure (1940)
 Counterfeiters (1940)
 Friedemann Bach (1941)
 5 June (1942)
 Melody of a Great City (1943)
 The Master Detective (1944)
 The Roedern Affair (1944)
 Tell the Truth (1946)
 Twelve Hearts for Charly (1949)
 Sensation in Savoy (1950)

References

Bibliography
 Giesen, Rolf. Nazi Propaganda Films: A History and Filmography. McFarland, 2003.

External links

1911 births
1989 deaths
German cinematographers
Film people from Berlin